BBC Radio 1 Live in Concert is a 1993 live album by Sham 69. It was recorded by the BBC during the band's concert at the Paris Theatre in London on 21 February 1979 and released as a live album in 1993.

Track listing 
"Everybody's Innocent" - 2:33
"Angels with Dirty Faces" - 3:26
"Anyway Who Gives An Damn" -  3:55
"That's Life" - 2:33
"Tell Us The Truth" - 3:14
"Borstal Breakout" - 3:38
"Day Tripper" - 4:01 (John Lennon, Paul McCartney)
"Questions and Answers - 4:35
"If the Kids Are United" - 4:16

Personnel 
 Dave Tregunna - bass guitar
 Jimmy Pursey - vocals
 Mark Cain - drums
 Dave Guy Parsons - guitar

References 

 Discogs.com

Sham 69 live albums
1993 live albums
BBC Radio recordings